Alfredo Pelé  (born 29 September 1991), known as Pelé, is a professional footballer who plays as a midfielder for Primeira Liga club Famalicão, on loan from Monaco. Born in Portugal, he represents the Guinea-Bissau national team.

Club career

Belenenses
Born in Agualva-Cacém to Bissau-Guinean parents, Pelé started his career with local Belenenses. He made his first-team – and Primeira Liga – debut on 11 January 2009, playing the full 90 minutes in a 1–0 away win against Rio Ave.

Much more used in his first full season (seven starts, 642 minutes of action), Pelé's team would nonetheless suffer relegation, ranking second-bottom.

Italy
On 4 January 2011, after having been linked to the club in September 2010, Pelé was signed by Serie A side Genoa, with the deal being made effective in the summer. However, he only appeared for the under-20 reserves during his spell.

On 30 August 2011, Pelé was exchanged with A.C. Milan's Mario Sampirisi, both in a co-ownership deal. He played as an overage player (only four players born in 1991 were allowed that season) for the B team in his first year.

Loans
On 31 July 2012, Pelé was loaned out to Arsenal Kyiv in the Ukrainian Premier League. He spent the following campaign in the same situation, with Olhanense back in his homeland.

After a successful loan spell at Belenenses, where he scored seven competitive goals to help his team finish in sixth position and qualify for the UEFA Europa League, Pelé attracted the interest of Benfica, who signed him for 2015–16. He was immediately loaned to Paços de Ferreira, and on 31 January 2017, still owned by the former, joined Feirense also in the Portuguese top flight.

Rio Ave
On 29 June 2017, Pelé signed a five-year contract with Rio Ave. He scored seven league goals in 38 official matches in his first and only season, helping to qualification for the Europa League second qualifying round after a sixth-place finish.

Monaco
Pelé moved to Ligue 1 in July 2018, agreeing to a five-year deal at Monaco – Benfica and Rio Ave shared the €10 million transfer fee in equal parts. He made his debut in the competition on 28 September, starting in a 2–0 away loss to Saint-Étienne and being replaced by Benjamin Henrichs late into the second half.

On 31 January 2019, Pelé joined English club Nottingham Forest on loan for the remainder of the season. On 6 August, in the same situation, he moved to Reading also of the EFL Championship. He scored his first goal for the latter on 7 March 2020, in a 3–1 away victory over Birmingham City.

Pelé returned to Rio Ave on 29 September 2020, on yet another loan. On 5 August 2022, still owned by Monaco, he agreed to a deal at Famalicão.

International career
Pelé played twice for Portugal in the 2010 UEFA European Under-19 Championship qualification, in both games as a substitute, but was not selected for either the final tournament or the elite qualifying phase. He was then picked for a warm-up friendly before the 2011 FIFA U-20 World Cup, a 3–3 draw with France, and appeared in all the matches in the finals in Colombia as the nation finished in second position.

Pelé made his debut for Guinea-Bissau on 10 June 2017, starting in a 1–0 win over Namibia for the 2019 Africa Cup of Nations qualifiers. He was selected by manager Baciro Candé for the finals in Egypt, playing three games in a group-stage exit.

Also part of the squad for the 2021 tournament, Pelé missed a penalty in the last minutes of the 0–0 draw against Sudan in Garoua.

Career statistics

Club

International

Scores and results list Guinea-Bissau's goal tally first, score column indicates score after each Pelé goal.

Honours
Portugal U20
FIFA U-20 World Cup runner-up: 2011

Orders
 Knight of the Order of Prince Henry

References

External links

1991 births
Living people
People from Sintra
Citizens of Guinea-Bissau through descent
Portuguese sportspeople of Bissau-Guinean descent
Sportspeople from Lisbon District
Bissau-Guinean footballers
Portuguese footballers
Association football midfielders
Primeira Liga players
Liga Portugal 2 players
C.F. Os Belenenses players
S.C. Olhanense players
S.L. Benfica footballers
F.C. Paços de Ferreira players
C.D. Feirense players
Rio Ave F.C. players
F.C. Famalicão players
Genoa C.F.C. players
A.C. Milan players
Ukrainian Premier League players
FC Arsenal Kyiv players
Ligue 1 players
AS Monaco FC players
English Football League players
Nottingham Forest F.C. players
Reading F.C. players
Portugal youth international footballers
Portugal under-21 international footballers
Guinea-Bissau international footballers
2019 Africa Cup of Nations players
2021 Africa Cup of Nations players
Bissau-Guinean expatriate footballers
Portuguese expatriate footballers
Expatriate footballers in Italy
Expatriate footballers in Ukraine
Expatriate footballers in France
Expatriate footballers in Monaco
Expatriate footballers in England
Portuguese expatriate sportspeople in Italy
Portuguese expatriate sportspeople in Ukraine
Bissau-Guinean expatriate sportspeople in Italy
Bissau-Guinean expatriate sportspeople in Ukraine
Bissau-Guinean expatriate sportspeople in France
Bissau-Guinean expatriate sportspeople in Monaco
Bissau-Guinean expatriate sportspeople in England